Grasshoppers Katwijk, better known as simply Grasshoppers, is a Dutch basketball club based in Katwijk. Its women's team plays in the Vrouwen Basketball League (VBL), the domestic first tier. Its men's team plays in the Promotiedivisie, the domestic second tier. Established in 1971, the team plays its home games at Cleijn Duin.

Honours

Women's
Vrouwen Basketball League
Winners (2): 2017–18, 2018–19
NBB Cup
Winners (4): 1983, 1994 1995, 2018
Supercup
Winners (1): 2018

Men's
Promotiedivisie
Runners-up (3): 2017, 2018, 2019

European record
Women's team

Notes

Notable players

Women's team
 Natalie van den Adel (1 season: 2012–13)

Season by season

Basketball teams in the Netherlands
Women's basketball teams in the Netherlands
Basketball teams established in 1971
Sports clubs in Katwijk